Clogg as a surname can refer to:

 Richard Clogg (born 1939), British historian
 Tramun Clogg, fictional character created by Brian Jacques